Taillon is a provincial electoral district in the Montérégie region of Quebec, Canada that elects members to the National Assembly of Quebec.  It comprises part of the borough of Le Vieux-Longueuil of the city of Longueuil.

It was created for the 1966 election from Verchères and Chambly electoral districts.

It was named after former Quebec Premier Louis-Olivier Taillon who was in power for four days in 1886 and from 1892 to 1896. It is best known as the riding of Parti Québécois founder René Lévesque, who served as premier from 1976 to 1985.

For the better part of four decades after the PQ seized it in 1976, Taillon was a stronghold for both the PQ and the sovereigntist cause. In the 1995 Quebec referendum it voted 61% for Quebec to separate. However, in 2018, the Coalition Avenir Québec narrowly won it amid its near-sweep of Montérégie.

Members of the Legislative Assembly / National Assembly
This riding has elected the following Members of the National Assembly:

Election results

 
|Liberal
|Marie-Ève Pelletier
|align="right"|7,470
|align="right"|19.37
|align="right"|-13.6

 
|Liberal
|Richard Bélisle
|align="right"|10,691
|align="right"|32.97
|align="right"|+9.97

|-
 
|Liberal
|Anne Pâquet
|align="right"|9,104
|align="right"|23.00
|align="right"|-8.29
|-

|-

|}

|-
 
|Liberal
|Véronique Mercier
|align="right"|5,966
|align="right"|31.29
|align="right"|-2.88

|-

|-

|-

|Independent
|Tristan Dénommée Pigeon
|align="right"|143
|align="right"|0.75
|align="right"|-
|-

|}
* Increase is from UFP

|-
 
|Liberal
|Nicole Bourget Laramée
|align="right"|12,372
|align="right"|31.01
|align="right"|-3.84

|-
 
|Socialist Democracy
|Pascal Durand
|align="right"|345
|align="right"|0.86
|align="right"|-
|-

|Innovator
|Monique Murray
|align="right"|147
|align="right"|0.37
|align="right"|-
|}

|-
 
|Liberal
|Philippe Angers
|align="right"|13,321
|align="right"|34.85
|align="right"|-2.15
|-

|Natural Law
|René-William Roy
|align="right"|844
|align="right"|2.21
|align="right"|- 
|-

|Sovereignty
|Réal Pineault
|align="right"|746
|align="right"|1.95
|align="right"|-
|}

|-
 
|Liberal
|Rodrigue Dubé
|align="right"|12,562
|align="right"|37.00
|align="right"|-6.94
|-

|-

|New Democrat
|Marc Vachon
|align="right"|508
|align="right"|1.50
|align="right"|-1.14
|-

|Workers
|Marie-Claire Ferland
|align="right"|302
|align="right"|0.89
|align="right"|-
|-

|Parti indépendantiste
|Erich Laforest
|align="right"|232
|align="right"|0.68
|align="right"|-0.71
|}

|-
 
|Liberal
|Ginette Desjardins Olivier
|align="right"|13,191
|align="right"|43.94
|align="right"|+14.12
|-

|New Democrat
|Jean-Serge Baribeau
|align="right"|791
|align="right"|2.64
|align="right"|-
|-

|Parti indépendantiste
|Michel Milette
|align="right"|418
|align="right"|1.39
|align="right"|-
|-

|-

|Christian Socialist
|François Séguin
|align="right"|91
|align="right"|0.30
|align="right"|-
|-

|United Social Credit
|Michel Bilodeau
|align="right"|91
|align="right"|0.30
|align="right"|+0.19
|}

|-
 
|Liberal
|Lawrence R. Wilson
|align="right"|9,500
|align="right"|29.82
|align="right"|+8.22
|-

|-

|Independent
|Pierre Arnault
|align="right"|69
|align="right"|0.22
|align="right"|-
|-

|Workers Communist
|Suzanne Ouellet
|align="right"|68
|align="right"|0.21
|align="right"|-
|-

|United Social Credit
|Gaétan Bernard
|align="right"|36
|align="right"|0.11
|align="right"|-3.80
|-

|}

|-
 
|Liberal
|Fernand Blanchard
|align="right"|11,753
|align="right"|21.60
|align="right"|-25.06
|-

|-

|-

|New Democrat
|Jacques Beaudoin
|align="right"|256
|align="right"|0.47
|align="right"|-
|}

|-
 
|Liberal
|Guy Leduc
|align="right"|18,346
|align="right"|46.66
|align="right"|+4.03

|-

|Parti créditiste
|Bernard-E. Laplante
|align="right"|2,546
|align="right"|6.48
|align="right"|-0.82
|-

|-

|Independent
|Jean-Paul Paré
|align="right"|103
|align="right"|0.26
|align="right"|-
|}

|-
 
|Liberal
|Guy Leduc
|align="right"|16,501
|align="right"|42.63
|align="right"|+4.02

|-

|-

|Independent
|Serge Mongeau
|align="right"|2,998
|align="right"|7.75
|align="right"|-
|-

|-

|Independent
|Gaston Gobeil
|align="right"|134
|align="right"|0.35
|align="right"|-
|-

|Independent
|Robert Meunier
|align="right"|113
|align="right"|0.29
|align="right"|-
|}

|-
 
|Liberal
|Guy Leduc
|align="right"|8,627
|align="right"|38.61
|-

|-

|RIN 
|Jacques Ferron
|align="right"|4,097
|align="right"|18.34
|-

|Ralliement national
|Robert Tremblay
|align="right"|685
|align="right"|3.07
|-

|Independent
|Gaston Prévost
|align="right"|517
|align="right"|2.31
|}

References

External links
Information
 Elections Quebec

Election results
 Election results (National Assembly)

Maps
 2011 map (PDF)
 2001 map (Flash)
2001–2011 changes (Flash)
1992–2001 changes (Flash)
 Electoral map of Montérégie region
 Quebec electoral map, 2011

Politics of Longueuil
Quebec provincial electoral districts